The Sheraton Grand Mirage Resort, Port Douglas, is a seaside resort hotel on Four Mile Beach in Port Douglas, Far North Queensland, Australia.

History
Developed by businessman Christopher Skase at a reported cost of $100 million, the resort was officially opened in October 1987, and has been said to have transformed Port Douglas "from a sleepy far-north Queensland seaside town into a sophisticated tropical playground for the rich and famous."

Guests known to have stayed at the resort include former President of the United States Bill Clinton and his wife, former United States Secretary of State Hillary Clinton, Hollywood stars Kate Hudson, Matthew McConaughey, Leonardo DiCaprio, Tom Hanks and John Travolta, opera singer Luciano Pavarotti, supermodel Claudia Schiffer, and rock singer Mick Jagger and his ex-wife, model Jerry Hall.

In 2004, the resort began a major refurbishment program, and in 2011 it was purchased by Melbourne property developer David Marriner and Chinese investor the Fullshare Group for $35 million. In 2013, Marriner sold his shareholding to the Fullshare Group.

Another major redevelopment commenced in May 2015. It had a budget of $43 million and was completed in August 2016.

Description
The resort's  site is adjacent to Four Mile Beach, Port Douglas. At its core is a group of multistorey buildings flanked by a "sprawling network" of 10 "lagoons". The site also includes tennis courts, an 18-hole golf course, the Kaia day spa and a gymnasium. Port Douglas's main drag, Macrossan Street, is less than 10 minutes' drive away, as is the town's marina, which offers boat trips to the Great Barrier Reef. The town is also about an hour from Cairns Airport.

Typically the resort hosts about 700 guests, and at peak times around 900. However, it has an uncrowded feel. Onsite dining is headed up by the acclaimed restaurant Harrisons, which is operated by chef-owner Spencer Patrick. Opened in central Port Douglas in 2007, it relocated to the resort in 2017. Other onsite food and drink facilities include Feast, which is both a breakfast bar and an a la carte Italian restaurant, Lagoon House, and the Daintree Bar.

References

External links

Sheraton Grand Mirage Resort, Port Douglas – official site

Buildings and structures completed in 1987
Hotels established in 1987
Hotel buildings completed in 1987
Hotels in Queensland
Sheraton hotels
1987 establishments in Australia